Anie Pascale is a Canadian actress. She was nominated for a 2009 Genie Award for Best Performance by an Actress in a Supporting Role for her role in Everything Is Fine (Tout est parfait). She has appeared in a few other television and film roles.

References

Canadian film actresses
Canadian television actresses
Living people
Place of birth missing (living people)
Year of birth missing (living people)
Actresses from Quebec